Chomýž is a municipality and village in Kroměříž District in the Zlín Region of the Czech Republic. It has about 400 inhabitants.

Notable people
Francis Dvornik (1893–1975), historian and priest

References

Villages in Kroměříž District